In periodontal disease, not only does the bone that supports the teeth, known as alveolar bone, reduce in height in relation to the teeth, but the morphology of the remaining alveolar bone is altered.  The bone destruction patterns that occur as a result of periodontal disease generally take on characteristic forms.

Types of destruction
There are four chief types of bone defects that present in the alveolar bone:
 horizontal defects
 vertical, or angular, defects
 fenestrations
 dehiscences

Horizontal defects
Generalized bone loss occurs most frequently as horizontal bone loss. Horizontal bone loss manifests as a somewhat even degree of bone resorption so that the height of the bone in relation to the teeth has been uniformly decreased, as indicated in the radiograph to the rig defects occur adjacent to a tooth and usually in the form of a triangular area of missing bone, known as triangulation.

References

Dentistry